Caloplaca mereschkowskiana is a species of lichen in the family Teloschistaceae. Found in Western Australia, it was described as new to science in 2011. The specific epithet mereschkowskiana honours Russian biologist Konstantin Mereschkowski, who described Caloplaca brachyspora.

See also
List of Caloplaca species

References

Teloschistales
Lichen species
Lichens described in 2011
Lichens of Australia
Taxa named by Ingvar Kärnefelt